The Chang-Sat Bangkok 2 Open is a tennis tournament held in Bangkok, Thailand since 2010.

Past finals

Singles

Doubles

References

External links

 
2010 establishments in Thailand
2010 disestablishments in Thailand
Tennis
Tennis
ATP Challenger Tour
Hard court tennis tournaments
September sporting events
Recurring sporting events established in 2010
Recurring events disestablished in 2010
Tennis
Tennis in Bangkok
Tennis tournaments in Thailand
Defunct tennis tournaments in Thailand